Sir Herbert Perrott (c. 1617 – 1 August 1683) was an English politician who sat in the House of Commons  at various times between 1659 and 1679.

Perrott was the son of Robert Perrott of Moreton. He was of Haroldston and Wellington, Herefordshire.
He was a cousin of his fellow MP Thomas Tomkins.

In 1659, Perrott was elected Member of Parliament for Weobley in the Third Protectorate Parliament. He was re-elected MP for Weobley  in the Convention Parliament in August 1660 after the previous election was declared void. He was knighted on 14 August 1660 and served as High Sheriff of Herefordshire for 1661–62 and High Sheriff of Pembrokeshire for 1665–66.

In 1677, Perrott was elected MP for Haverfordwest in the Cavalier Parliament and sat until 1679.
 
Perrott died at the age of 66 and was commemorated in a tablet in Wellington Church. He had married a daughter of George Barlow of Slebech and sister of Sir John Barlow. His daughter Hester married Sir John Pakington, 4th Baronet.

References

1617 births
1683 deaths
People from Weobley
Members of the Parliament of England (pre-1707) for constituencies in Wales
Year of birth uncertain
Herbert
High Sheriffs of Herefordshire
High Sheriffs of Pembrokeshire
English MPs 1659
English MPs 1661–1679